The road speed skating competition at the 2017 World Games took place from July 24 to July 25, in Wrocław in Poland, at the Millennium Park.

Participating nations

Medal table

Medalists

Men

Women

References

External links
 The World Games 2017
 Result Book

2017 World Games